Calliostoma swinneni is a species of marine gastropod mollusc in the family Calliostomatidae.

Range of distribution
This species is endemic to the Philippines. It is found in Aliguay Island, Mindanao.

Habitat
This top shell lives at depths of about 100 m.

Shell description
The shape of the shell is high conical. The first whorls are straight but later whorls are concave.

Coloration of the shell is cream white or with faint brown flecks.

The shell height is up to 13 mm, and the width is up to 10 mm. It is small for the genus.

References

 Bouchet, P.; Fontaine, B. (2009). List of new marine species described between 2002-2006. Census of Marine Life.

External links
 

swinneni
Gastropods described in 2006